George Latham may refer to:

George Latham (footballer) (1881–1939), Welsh professional footballer and coach
George Latham (architect) (died 1871), English architect
George R. Latham (1832–1917), American politician and lawyer from Virginia and West Virginia
George William Latham (1827–1886), MP for Crewe, 1885–1886